Megastigmus  is a genus of minute wasps. There are more than 134 described species, more than half of which undergo larval development within the seeds of trees and shrubs.

List of species

 Megastigmus acaciae Noble, 1939
 Megastigmus aculeatus (Swederus, 1795)
 Megastigmus adelaidensis Girault, 1915
 Megastigmus amamoori Girault, 1925
 Megastigmus amicorum Boucek, 1969
 Megastigmus asteri Ashmead, 1900
 Megastigmus atedius Walker, 1851
 Megastigmus ater (Girault, 1927)
 Megastigmus banksiae (Girault, 1929)
 Megastigmus bipunctatus (Swederus, 1795)
 Megastigmus borriesi Crosby, 1913
 Megastigmus borus Walker, 1839
 Megastigmus brachychitoni Froggatt, 1905
 Megastigmus brachyscelidis Ashmead, 1900
 Megastigmus brevicaudis Ratzeburg, 1852
 Megastigmus brevivalvus (Girault, 1926)
 Megastigmus cecili Girault, 1929
 Megastigmus copelandi Roques & Copeland, 2016
 Megastigmus cotoneastri Nikolskaya, 1952
 Megastigmus cynipedis (Cuvier, 1833)
 Megastigmus darlingi (Girault, 1940)
 Megastigmus dorsalis (Fabricius, 1798)
 Megastigmus drances Walker, 1839
 Megastigmus duclouxiana Roques & Pan, 1995
 Megastigmus dumicola Boucek, 1982
 Megastigmus eucalypti Girault, 1915
 Megastigmus fieldingi Girault, 1915
 Megastigmus flavivariegatus Girault, 1915
 Megastigmus fulvipes (Girault, 1913)
 Megastigmus fuscicornis Girault, 1913
 Megastigmus gravis Nikolskaya, 1966
 Megastigmus grewianae Roques & Copeland, 2016
 Megastigmus grotiusi Girault, 1915
 Megastigmus helinae Roques & Copeland, 2016
 Megastigmus herndoni Girault, 1935
 Megastigmus hilaris Girault, 1929
 Megastigmus hilli Dodd, 1917
 Megastigmus hoffmeyeri Walley, 1932
 Megastigmus iamenus Walker, 1839
 Megastigmus icipeensis Roques & Copeland, 2016
 Megastigmus lanneae Roques & Copeland, 2016
 Megastigmus lasiocarpae Crosby, 1913
 Megastigmus laventhali Roques & Copeland, 2016
 Megastigmus likiangensis Roques & Sun, 1995
 Megastigmus limoni (Girault, 1926)
 Megastigmus longicauda Girault, 1913
 Megastigmus maculatipennis (Girault, 1913)
 Megastigmus melleus Girault, 1915
 Megastigmus mercatori (Girault, 1940)
 Megastigmus milleri Milliron, 1949
 Megastigmus nigripropodeum Girault, 1934
 Megastigmus nigrovariegatus Ashmead, 1890
 Megastigmus ozoroae Roques & Copeland, 2016
 Megastigmus pallidiocellus Girault, 1929
 Megastigmus pascali (Girault, 1933)
 Megastigmus pergracilis Girault, 1915
 Megastigmus pictus (Förster, 1841)
 Megastigmus pingii Roques & Sun, 1995
 Megastigmus pinsapinis Hoffmeyer, 1931
 Megastigmus pinus Parfitt, 1857
 Megastigmus pistaciae Walker, 1871
 Megastigmus quadrifasciativentris Girault, 1915
 Megastigmus quadrisetae Girault, 1927
 Megastigmus quinquefasciatus Girault, 1915
 Megastigmus quinquesetae (Girault, 1934)
 Megastigmus rafni Hoffmeyer, 1929
 Megastigmus rigidae Xu & He, 1998
 Megastigmus rosae Bouček, 1971
 Megastigmus schimitscheki Novitzky, 1954
 Megastigmus sexsetae Girault, 1927
 Megastigmus sichuanensis Doğanlar & Zheng, 2017
 Megastigmus smithi Roques & Copeland, 2016
 Megastigmus speciosus Girault, 1915
 Megastigmus specularis Walley, 1932
 Megastigmus spermotrophus Wachtl, 1893
 Megastigmus stigmatizans (Fabricius, 1798)
 Megastigmus strobilobius Ratzeburg, 1848
 Megastigmus sulcicollis Cameron, 1912
 Megastigmus suspectus Borries, 1895
 Megastigmus synophri Mayr, 1874
 Megastigmus tasmaniensis Girault, 1913
 Megastigmus thyoides Kamijo, 1997
 Megastigmus tostini Girault, 1934
 Megastigmus transvaalensis (Hussey, 1956)
 Megastigmus trisulcatus (Girault, 1915)
 Megastigmus trisulcus (Girault, 1934)
 Megastigmus usakensis Doğanlar & Zengin, 2018
 Megastigmus viggianii Narendran & Sureshan, 1988
 Megastigmus voltairei (Girault, 1925)
 Megastigmus wachtli Seitner, 1916
 Megastigmus walsinghami Girault, 1929

References 

Hymenoptera genera
Chalcidoidea